Charles Harold Chorley, CB (10 June 1912 – 22 December 1990) was a British lawyer and parliamentary draftsman.

Born in 1912, he was the son of Arthur R. Chorley (died 1918) of Leeds. He was educated at Trinity College, Oxford, and graduated with a BA in 1933. Called to the bar the next year, he joined the Office of the Parliamentary Counsel in 1938, and was appointed a Parliamentary Counsel in 1950. Promotion to Second Parliamentary Counsel followed in 1968, but Chorley retired the following year. He had been appointed a Companion of the Order of the Bath in 1959.

Chorley died on 22 December 1990; he was survived by his two children, but his wife had predeceased him (dying in 1980).

References 

1912 births
1990 deaths
Members of the Inner Temple
Alumni of Trinity College, Oxford
Companions of the Order of the Bath
20th-century English lawyers